Ellaam Ninakku Vendi is a 1981 Indian Malayalam film, directed by J. Sasikumar and produced by T. E. Vasudevan. The film stars Prem Nazir, Srividya, Sukumaran and Sumalatha in the lead roles. The film has musical score by V. Dakshinamoorthy. The film was a remake of Kannada film Devara Kannu originally based on a Bengali novel by Nihar Ranjan Gupta.

Cast

Prem Nazir as Dr.Rajendran
Srividya as Jayalakshmi
Sukumaran as Dr. Mohan Kumar
Sumalatha as Sreedevi
Jagathy Sreekumar as Kurup
Adoor Bhasi as Panikkar
Kottayam Santha as Bharati
Sankaradi Ammavan
Alummoodan as Inspector
Janardanan as Somarajan
Lalu Alex as Unnikrishnan
P. R. Varalekshmi
Poojappura Ravi as Venu
 Paravoor Bharathan as Panchayath President
 K. P. A. C. Lalitha as Thankamani
 Kozhikode Siddique as Lawyer

Soundtrack
The music was composed by V. Dakshinamoorthy and the lyrics were written by Sreekumaran Thampi and P. A. Sayyed.

References

External links
 

1981 films
1980s Malayalam-language films
Films directed by J. Sasikumar
Malayalam remakes of Kannada films
Films based on works by Nihar Ranjan Gupta
Films scored by V. Dakshinamoorthy